Melaleuca uxorum is a plant in the myrtle family Myrtaceae and is endemic to the northern Herberton Range in far north Queensland. It is a newly described (2004) species similar to Melaleuca sylvana and Melaleuca monantha, also from far north Queensland.

Description 

Head of flowers appear on the ends of the branches in November and December, each head composed of 4 to 12 groups of flowers, each group composed of three flowers. The stamens are pure white, in five bundles around the flower with 6 to 12 stamens per bundle.

Taxonomy and naming
The specific epithet (uxorum) is from the Latin uxor meaning "wife", "in collective honour of Kirsty, Jenny and Nada, the wives, respectively, of each of the authors of this name, for their companionship in the field and enthusiasm for plants generally".

Distribution and habitat
Melaleuca uxorum occurs in the northern Herberton Range on pavements of acidic volcanic rock, in association with Eucalyptus lockyeri.

Ecology

Response to fire
After fire, Melaleuca uxorum resprouts at the stem base and along stems from epicormic buds. The species forms small colonies which appear to have developed from both sexual and asexual reproduction.

Conservation
Melaleuca uxorum is classified as Endangered by the Queensland Nature Conservation Act 1992.

References

uxorum
Myrtales of Australia
Flora of Queensland
Plants described in 2004
Taxa named by Lyndley Craven